Pleasants County is a county located in the U.S. state of West Virginia. At the 2020 census, the population was 7,653. Its county seat is St. Marys.

History
Pleasants County was formed by the Virginia General Assembly from portions of adjacent Wood, Ritchie and Tyler counties on March 29, 1851. The county's namesake is James Pleasants, Jr., an esteemed former US Senator and Virginia Governor. On June 20, 1863, at the height of the Civil War, Pleasants County was one of fifty Virginia counties that entered the Union as the state of West Virginia.

In 1863, West Virginia's counties were divided into civil townships, with the intention of encouraging local government.  This proved impractical in the heavily rural state, and in 1872 the townships were converted into magisterial districts.  Pleasants County was divided into six districts: Grant, Jefferson, Lafayette, McKim, Union, and Washington.  These remained largely unchanged for over a century, but in the 1980s the six historic magisterial districts were consolidated into four new districts: District A, District B, District C, and District D.

Geography
It is the fourth-smallest county in West Virginia by area.

Major highways
 West Virginia Route 2
 West Virginia Route 16
 West Virginia Route 807

Adjacent counties
Washington County, Ohio (north)
Tyler County (east)
Ritchie County (southeast)
Wood County (southwest)

National protected area
Ohio River Islands National Wildlife Refuge (part)

Demographics

2000 census
As of the census of 2000, there were 7,514 people, 2,887 households, and 2,136 families living in the county.  The population density was 58 people per square mile (22/km2).  There were 3,214 housing units at an average density of 25 per square mile (9/km2).  The racial makeup of the county was 98.30% White, 0.48% Black or African American, 0.47% Native American, 0.20% Asian, 0.07% from other races, and 0.49% from two or more races.  0.37% of the population were Hispanic or Latino of any race.

There were 2,887 households, out of which 32.70% had children under the age of 18 living with them, 60.10% were married couples living together, 10.40% had a female householder with no husband present, and 26.00% were non-families. 22.90% of all households were made up of individuals, and 12.30% had someone living alone who was 65 years of age or older.  The average household size was 2.51 and the average family size was 2.93.

In the county, the population was spread out, with 23.80% under the age of 18, 7.80% from 18 to 24, 28.70% from 25 to 44, 24.80% from 45 to 64, and 14.90% who were 65 years of age or older.  The median age was 39 years. For every 100 females there were 100.20 males.  For every 100 females age 18 and over, there were 96.20 males.

The median income for a household in the county was $32,736, and the median income for a family was $37,795. Males had a median income of $31,068 versus $18,077 for females. The per capita income for the county was $16,920.  About 10.90% of families and 13.70% of the population were below the poverty line, including 17.80% of those under age 18 and 7.90% of those age 65 or over.

2010 census
As of the 2010 United States census, there were 7,605 people, 2,861 households, and 2,021 families living in the county. The racial makeup of the county was 97.3% white, 1.3% black or African American, 0.2% American Indian, 0.1% Asian, 0.1% from other races, and 1.0% from two or more races. Those of Hispanic or Latino origin made up 0.8% of the population. In terms of ancestry,

Of the 2,861 households, 31.0% had children under the age of 18 living with them, 56.1% were married couples living together, 9.8% had a female householder with no husband present, 29.4% were non-families, and 24.9% of all households were made up of individuals. The average household size was 2.44 and the average family size was 2.90. The median age was 42.4 years.

The median income for a household in the county was $38,882 and the median income for a family was $54,391. Males had a median income of $52,738 versus $23,750 for females. The per capita income for the county was $18,770. About 6.7% of families and 13.7% of the population were below the poverty line, including 12.6% of those under age 18 and 10.8% of those age 65 or over.

Education
In Pleasants County, there is a single school district including one high school, one middle school, and two elementary schools. The county is also served by the Mid Ohio Valley Technical Institute, which offers vocational education in a variety of fields.

Politics
Although Pleasants County, like neighbouring rock-ribbed Unionist and Republican Ritchie, Doddridge and Tyler Counties, voted against secession at the Virginia Secession Convention, during the Third Party System the county voted consistently Democratic. However, from 1900 onwards the county has generally voted Republican except in strong Democratic election victories, and like all of West Virginia it has become rock-ribbed GOP in the twenty-first century as a consequence of de-unionization in the coal industry.

Communities

Cities
City of St. Marys

Towns
Town of Belmont

Magisterial districts

Current
District A
District B
District C
District D

Historic
Grant
Jefferson
Lafayette
McKim
Union
Washington

Unincorporated communities
Arvilla
Calcutta
Hebron
Pine Grove
Vaucluse

See also
National Register of Historic Places listings in Pleasants County, West Virginia

References

 
West Virginia counties
West Virginia counties on the Ohio River
Counties of Appalachia
1851 establishments in Virginia